Ignace Dubus-Bonnel (born 11.05.1794 in Lille, France) was a Parisian craftsman, who most notably was the first to get a patent for a method of creating and weaving glass threads, the predecessor of fiberglass, in 1836.

References

Artists from Paris
Year of birth missing
Year of death missing